Felix Khojoyan (born on 22 December 1974), is an Armenian football manager and former footballer who mainly played as defender throughout his career.

Khojoyan was a member of the Armenia national team, being capped 18 times. Currently, he is working as an assistant manager in Armenian Premier League club FC Shirak.

External links
 

Living people
1974 births
FC Shirak players
Pegah Gilan players
Armenian footballers
Armenia international footballers
Armenian expatriate footballers
Expatriate footballers in Iran
Armenian football managers
Armenian Premier League players
Association football defenders